Wally Harris may refer to:

 Wally Harris (Australian footballer) (1919–2001), Australian rules footballer
 Wally Harris (English footballer) (1900–1933), English professional footballer
 Wally Harris (referee) (born 1935), National Hockey League referee

See also
Walter Harris (disambiguation)